Mark Henry "Napper" Tandy (3 September 1892 – 17 March 1965) was an Australian rules footballer in the (then) Victorian Football League in the early 20th century.

Family
The son of Henry Thomas Tandy, and Catherine Lucy Tandy (1860–1945), née Williams, Mark Henry Tandy was born in Newport, Victoria on 3 September 1892.

He married Lily Ford in 1917.

Football
His quiet and easy-going nature led to Roy Cazaly calling him "Napper" – "the inglorious nickname "Napper" … apparently arose because of his alleged propensity for "switching off" during games" (John Devaney, Full Points Footy Publications).

A supremely accomplished rover/wingman who, along with Roy Cazaly, tore the heart out of the opposition. Playing as a wingman early in his career, he brought South Melbourne their second premiership in the 1918 Grand Final.  With South trailing by a point, Tandy made an inspired run down the wing to deliver the ball into the forward lines where Laird kicked the winning goal.

Team of the Century
On 8 August 2003, he was selected as an interchange in the Sydney Swans "Team of the Century".

Hall of Fame
One of the initial 136 inductees, Tandy was inducted into the Australian Football Hall of Fame in 1996.

See also
 1921 Perth Carnival
 1924 Hobart Carnival

Footnotes

References 
 Holmesby, Russell & Main, Jim (2014). The Encyclopedia of AFL Footballers: Every AFL/VFL player since 1897 (10th ed.). Melbourne, Victoria: Bas Publishing. .
 Ross, J. (ed), 100 Years of Australian Football 1897–1996: The Complete Story of the AFL, All the Big Stories, All the Great Pictures, All the Champions, Every AFL Season Reported, Viking, (Ringwood), 1996.

External links
 
 
 Mark Tandy, at Boyles Football Photos.
 AFL Hall of Fame

1892 births
1965 deaths
Australian rules footballers from Melbourne
Australian Rules footballers: place kick exponents
Sydney Swans players
Sydney Swans Premiership players
Yarraville Football Club players
Australian Football Hall of Fame inductees
One-time VFL/AFL Premiership players
People from Newport, Victoria